Shuvu Banim (also Yeshivat Breslov—Nechamat Tzion) is a yeshiva in the Old City of Jerusalem. The yeshiva has approximately 1,500 students.

History
The yeshiva was founded in 1978 in Bnei Brak by Rabbi Eliezer Berland, who is still the rosh yeshiva. It is a Breslov yeshiva based on the teachings of Nachman of Breslov. About 30 percent of the student body is affiliated with the Haredi or national–religious communities. In 1980, an additional branch was opened in the Muslim Quarter of the Old City of Jerusalem. In 1982 the two branches merged into a single institution with the Bnei Brak yeshiva moving to Jerusalem. The yeshiva runs ten kollels, three yeshivot for young men, a Talmud Torah, an elementary school for girls, a range of preschools and kindergartens, youth groups, and evening lectures for women.

References

External links
Shuvu Banim International English website
Shuvu Bonim educational institutions

Hasidic Judaism in Jerusalem
Orthodox yeshivas in Jerusalem
Educational institutions established in 1978
Kabbalah
Baalei teshuva institutions
Orthodox Jewish outreach
Religious Zionist yeshivot
Breslov Hasidism
Hebrew-language names
Ukrainian-Jewish culture in Israel
Old City (Jerusalem)